"Keep On Smilin'" is a 1974 hit song by the American group Wet Willie. It was the title track of their third studio album.

The song was also their first of three top 40 singles and became their greatest hit. "Keep on Smilin' reached No. 10 on the U.S. Billboard Hot 100 and is ranked as the 66th biggest hit of 1974. It also charted in Canada.

Charts

Weekly charts

Year-end charts

References

External links
 

1974 songs
1974 singles
Wet Willie songs
Capricorn Records singles
Song recordings produced by Tom Dowd